Aleksandr Artynyuk (9 September 1935 – 16 February 2019) was a Ukrainian long-distance runner. He competed in the men's 5000 metres at the 1960 Summer Olympics.

References

External links
 

1935 births
2019 deaths
Athletes (track and field) at the 1960 Summer Olympics
Ukrainian male long-distance runners
Soviet male long-distance runners
Olympic athletes of the Soviet Union
People from Kherson Oblast